Springfield Local School District may refer to any of three districts in Ohio, US:

Springfield Local School District (Lucas County)
Springfield Local School District (Mahoning County), Mahoning County
Springfield Local School District (Summit County)

See also
Springfield City School District, Clark County, Ohio
Springfield School District (disambiguation)